The Swede Prairie Progressive Farmers' Club, also known as Roberg Hall, was a 1915 meeting hall of a local farmers' organization in Swede Prairie Township, Yellow Medicine County, Minnesota, United States, which became the township hall. It was listed on the National Register of Historic Places in 1986 as a rare physical reminder of the grassroots agricultural movements of the early 20th century.

See also
 National Register of Historic Places listings in Yellow Medicine County, Minnesota

References

1915 establishments in Minnesota
Clubhouses on the National Register of Historic Places in Minnesota
National Register of Historic Places in Yellow Medicine County, Minnesota